Sinan Tuzcu (born 10 July 1977) is a Turkish actor and scriptwriter.

Biography
Tuzcu first rose to prominence in 2005 with his role as Ömer in the TV series Ihlamurlar Altında. In the following year, he had a leading role in the operetta Ayşe, which was staged for the first time in 60 years. On 9 July 2006, he married actress Dolunay Soysert, with whom he shared the leading role in Ayşe. Tuzcu also wrote the play Sürmanşet which was staged by BKM and Istanbul Folk Theatre between 2008 and 2009.

In 2014, he wrote the script for the series Urfalıyam Ezelden, which was broadcast on Kanal D and Star TV. Together with Ali Aydın, he also wrote the script for the 2016 series Kehribar, which was broadcast on ATV. In the same year, he and Dolunay Soysert divorced.

In 2020, he again returned to stage with the play Yüzleşme, which was directed by Emre Kınay and staged at Duru Theatre.

Filmography

Film

Television

References

External links
 
 Sinan Tuzcu ~ SinemaTürk

1977 births
Living people
People from Gaziantep
Turkish male film actors
Turkish male television actors
Turkish male stage actors
Mimar Sinan Fine Arts University alumni